John William Smith, known as Jack Smith (28 October 1898 – 19 January 1977) was an English international footballer, who played as an inside-right.

Career
Born in Whitburn, Smith played for North Shields Athletic, before moving to South Shields, where he made 264 League appearances in eight seasons. He went on to join Portsmouth and played in the 1934 FA Cup Final side that lost to Manchester City in April 1934.

He earned three caps for England in 1931.

Four of his six brothers were also footballers. Billy also played for South Shields and Portsmouth and the two played together in the 1934 Cup Final. Sep played for Leicester City, and played against his brothers in the semi-final of the competition. Tom played for South Shields and later played for Manchester United and Northampton Town. Joe played reserve football for Leicester and later played for Watford.

References

1898 births
1977 deaths
People from Whitburn, Tyne and Wear
Footballers from Tyne and Wear
Footballers from County Durham
English footballers
England international footballers
North Shields F.C. players
South Shields F.C. (1889) players
Portsmouth F.C. players
AFC Bournemouth players
Leyton Orient F.C. players
English Football League players
Association football inside forwards
Jack
FA Cup Final players